Brianna Fannua Bellido Sterner (born 17 January 1993) is an American-born Peruvian former footballer who played as a midfielder. She has been a member of the Peru women's national team.

Early life
Bellido was raised in Mechanicsburg, Pennsylvania to a Peruvian father and an American mother.

High school and college career
Bellido has attended the Cumberland Valley High School in her hometown and the California University of Pennsylvania in California, Pennsylvania.

International career
Bellido represented Peru at the 2010 South American U-17 Women's Championship. She capped at senior level during the 2010 South American Women's Football Championship.

References

1993 births
Living people
Citizens of Peru through descent
Peruvian women's footballers
Women's association football midfielders
Peru women's international footballers
Peruvian people of American descent
Sportspeople of American descent
People from Mechanicsburg, Pennsylvania
Soccer players from Pennsylvania
American women's soccer players

California Vulcans athletes
College women's soccer players in the United States
American sportspeople of Peruvian descent